Hoda Afshar (born 1983) is an Iranian documentary photographer who is based in Melbourne. She is known for her 2018 prize-winning portrait of Kurdish-Iranian refugee Behrouz Boochani, who suffered a long imprisonment in the Manus Island detention centre run by the Australian government. Her work has been featured in many exhibitions and is held in many permanent collections across Australia.

Early life, education and early career
Afshar was born in Tehran, Iran, in 1983. She earned a bachelor's degree in fine art (photography) at the Azad University of Art and Architecture in Tehran, and began her career as a photographer in 2005. She moved to Australia in 2007, and completed her PhD in creative arts at Curtin University in 2019, with the subject of her thesis being "images of Islamic female identity".

Career

Her first project, in 2005, was a series of black and white photographs documenting Tehran's underground parties called Scene, but she could not show them in public.

Afshar's two-channel video work, Remain (2018), includes spoken poetry by Kurdish-Iranian refugee Behrouz Boochani and Iranian poet Bijan Elahi. Afshar describes her method as "staged documentary", in which the men on the island are able to "re-enact their narratives with their own bodies and [gives] them autonomy to narrate their own stories". The video was shown as part of the Primavera 2018 exhibition at the Museum of Contemporary Art Australia in Sydney, from 9 November 2018 to 3 February 2019. One of the photographs of Boochani taken for this project won the Bowness Photography Prize. This portrait, along with several others taken as part of the Remain project, are held by the Art Gallery of New South Wales.

Afshar was the subject of a Compass program on ABC Television in 2019, and in the same year was a judge for the National Portrait Gallery's National Photographic Portrait Prize.

In March 2021, an exhibition of Afshar's portraits of nine whistleblowers was mounted at St Paul's Cathedral in Melbourne, in an exhibition named Agonistes (after the Greek word agonistes, meaning a person engaged in a struggle).

Afshar says that her work explores how photographs may be "used or misused by power systems create certain hierarchies between people"; and that "[documentary photography] is a visual language that has been formed and established through the lens of colonisation".

Current positions
 Afshar teaches at the Victorian College of the Arts and Photography Studies College in Melbourne. She is also a board member of the Centre for Contemporary Photography.

Awards and recognition
 Moran Contemporary Photographic Prize (2015), finalist for Dog's Breakfast
 National Photographic Portrait Prize (2015), winner for Portrait of Ali
 Bowness Photography Prize (2017), finalist for Untitled #1
  Sotheby's Australia People's Choice Award (2018), winner for Portrait of Behrouz Boochani, Manus Island
 Bowness Photography Prize (2018), winner for Portrait of Behrouz Boochani, Manus Island
 Olive Cotton Award for Photographic Portraiture (2019), finalist for Portrait of Shamindan & Ramsiyar Manus Island
 Ramsay Art Prize (2021), Art Gallery of South Australia; finalist and People's Choice Prize, for Agonistes
 Sidney Myer Creative Fellowship (2021), an award of  given to mid-career creatives and thought leaders

Publications
 Speak the Wind (Mack, 2021; photographs by Hoda Afhsar; essay by Michael Taussig) This work documents the landscapes and people of the islands of Hormuz, Qeshm, and Hengam, in the Persian Gulf off the south coast of Iran. Afshar got to know some of the people there, travelling there frequently over the years, and they told her about the history of the place. She said that "their narrations led the project", and she explores "the idea of being possessed by history, and in this context, the history of slavery and cruelty”.

Selected exhibitions

Solo
 Behold (2017), Centre for Contemporary Photography
 Remain (2018–9), consisting of a video and a series of black-and-white portraits, Museum of Contemporary Art Australia, Sydney; University of Queensland Art Museum
 Agonistes (18 February – 7 March 2021), St Paul's Cathedral, Melbourne
 Speak the Wind (29 April – 22 May 2022), Monash Gallery of Art, Melbourne. One of a series of official exhibitions of PHOTO 2022: International Festival of Photography, taking place in Melbourne and regional Victoria

Group
 Primavera (2018), Museum of Contemporary Art Australia
 Enough خلص Khalas: Contemporary Australian Muslim Artists (2018), UNSW Galleries
 Women in Photography 2019: Remedy for Rage (2019), Objectifs
 The Shouting Valley (2019), Gus Fisher Gallery, (2020) The Physics Room
 Just Not Australian (2019), Artspace Visual Arts Centre
 Defining Place/Space: Contemporary Photography from Australia (2019), Museum of Photographic Arts
 Civilization: The Way We Live Now (2019), National Gallery of Victoria
 Refracted Reality (2020), Perth Institute of Contemporary Arts
 f_OCUS (2020), Counihan Gallery
 The Burning World (2020), Bendigo Art Gallery

Collections
Afshar's work is held in the following permanent collections:
National Gallery of Victoria (Remain, Untitled #5, Untitled #4, and Untitled #3)
Monash Gallery of Art (Untitled #4, Untitled #1, and Portrait of Behrouz Boochani, Manus Island)
Art Gallery of New South Wales (Remain, Ibrahim Mahjid, Behrouz Boochani, Emad Moradi, and Ari Sirwan)
Monash University Museum of Art (Behold #1, Behold #6, and Behold #12)
University of Queensland Art Museum (Remain)
Murdoch University Art Gallery: (Westoxicated #7, Westoxicated #9, Westoxicated #3, Westoxicated #1, Westoxicated #5, and Westoxicated #4)
Buxton Contemporary (University of Melbourne) (Westoxicated #1, Westoxicated #2, Westoxicated #4, Westoxicated #5, Westoxicated #6, Westoxicated #7, and Westoxicated #9)
Deakin University Art Collection
Art Gallery of Western Australia (Remain)

References

Further reading

 Afshar talks about Agonistes.

External links

1983 births
Iranian women photographers
Photography in Australia
Portrait photographers
Photographers from Melbourne
Living people
Documentary photographers
Women photojournalists